Balm is a locality in Alberta, Canada.

Balm was so named for balsam trees near the original town site.

References 

Localities in Lac Ste. Anne County